Akase (written: 赤瀬) is a Japanese surname. Notable people with the surname include:

, Japanese HIV/AIDS activist
, Japanese swimmer

Japanese-language surnames